Mordella insidiosa is a species of beetle in the genus Mordella of the family Mordellidae, which is part of the superfamily Tenebrionoidea. It was first described by Hippolyte Lucas in 1849.

References

Beetles described in 1849
insidiosa